Dwain Painter (born February 13, 1942) is a former American football coach. He served as the head football coach at Northern Arizona University from 1979 to 1981, compiling a record of 16–17. He was also an assistant coach at both the college and professional levels.

Head coaching record

College

References

1942 births
Living people
American football defensive backs
American football quarterbacks
BYU Cougars football coaches
Dallas Cowboys coaches
Denver Broncos coaches
Frankfurt Galaxy coaches
Georgia Tech Yellow Jackets football coaches
High school football coaches in New Jersey
Illinois Fighting Illini football coaches
Indianapolis Colts coaches
Junior college football coaches in the United States
Northern Arizona Lumberjacks football coaches
Pittsburgh Steelers coaches
Rutgers Scarlet Knights football players
San Diego Chargers coaches
San Jose State Spartans football coaches
Texas Longhorns football coaches
UCLA Bruins football coaches
People from Monroeville, Pennsylvania